The men's 4 x 100 metres relay at the 2016 European Athletics Championships took place at the Olympic Stadium on 9 and 10 July.

Records

Schedule

Results

Round 1
First 3 in each heat (Q) and 2 best performers (q) advance to the Final.

Final

References

External links
 amsterdam2016.org, official championship site.

Relay 4 x 100 M
Relays at the European Athletics Championships